Katryna Esposito is a Maltese judoka. She won the bronze medal in the women's 48kg category at the 2022 Commonwealth Games. It was Malta's first and only medal in this edition of the games. She was awarded Sportiva Tas-Sena at the SportMalta Awards Għażliet Sportivi Nazzjonali in 2023.

References

External links
 Katryna Esposito at International Judo Federation
 Katryna Esposito at Birmingham 2022

Living people
Place of birth missing (living people)
Maltese female judoka
Commonwealth Games medallists for Malta
Commonwealth Games bronze medallists for Malta
Commonwealth Games medallists in judo
Judoka at the 2022 Commonwealth Games
2000 births
21st-century Maltese women
Medallists at the 2022 Commonwealth Games